Jarren William Duran (born September 5, 1996) is an American professional baseball outfielder for the Boston Red Sox of Major League Baseball (MLB).

Amateur career
Duran attended Cypress High School in Cypress, California, then played three seasons of college baseball at California State University, Long Beach, where he was primarily a second baseman. In 2017, he played collegiate summer baseball for the Wareham Gatemen of the Cape Cod Baseball League. He was selected by the Boston Red Sox in the seventh round of the 2018 Major League Baseball draft.

Professional career
Duran spent his first professional season with the Lowell Spinners and Greenville Drive, batting a combined .357 during 2018. He started the 2019 season with the Class A-Advanced Salem Red Sox, and was promoted to the Double-A Portland Sea Dogs on June 3. In mid-June, Duran was added to the top 100 prospects list of Baseball America, at number 99. Duran was named to the 2019 All-Star Futures Game, going 1-for-2 after entering the game in the sixth inning. In mid-September, Duran was named the High-A (Class A-Advanced) player of the year by Baseball America, and was named the Red Sox' minor league baserunner of the year. Overall during 2019 with both Salem and Portland, Duran batted .303 with five home runs and 38 RBIs in 132 games.

Duran was invited to spring training by the Red Sox in 2020. He did not play that season, due to cancellation of the minor league season. In November 2020, Duran was ranked by Baseball America as the Red Sox' number five prospect. During the 2020–21 Puerto Rican Winter League season, he was named MVP of the final series, helping Criollos de Caguas to the championship.

2021
The Red Sox invited Duran to their spring training for the second consecutive season in 2021; he subsequently started the season with the Triple-A Worcester Red Sox. On July 16, he was selected to Boston's 40-man roster. He made his MLB debut the following day, starting in center field against the New York Yankees. In his first at-bat, he collected a hit off of Gerrit Cole and came around to score two batters later. He hit his first major-league home run on July 19 against Ross Stripling of the Toronto Blue Jays. Duran was placed on the COVID-19 related injured list on August 6, and returned to the lineup two days later. On August 24, Duran was optioned back to Triple-A, having batted .221 with 33 strikeouts in 89 plate appearances with Boston. He was recalled to Boston two days later, when Hunter Renfroe was placed on the bereavement list. On September 3, Duran was placed on the COVID-related list. He was activated on September 23 and optioned to Worcester. Overall with Boston during the regular season, Duran appeared in 33 games, batting .215 with two home runs and 10 RBIs. He also made 60 appearances for Worcester, batting .258 with 16 home runs and 36 RBIs.

2022
Duran started the 2022 season in Triple-A with Worcester. He was ranked 84th in the list of baseball's top 100 prospects by Baseball America. Duran was with Boston for the game of May 6, while Kiké Hernández was on the COVID-related injured list. He was also briefly with Boston in early June, while Jackie Bradley Jr. was on the paternity list. He was again recalled in mid-June when Christian Arroyo was placed on the COVID-related list. Duran remained with Boston until being placed on the restricted list in late June when the team traveled to Toronto, due to his vaccination status. On July 22, he once again fell victim to Toronto, this time in center field at Fenway Park where he lost track of a fly ball and apparently gave up on the play, resulting in Raimel Tapia of the Blue Jays scoring an inside-the-park grand slam; the Red Sox lost the game, 28–5, setting a Blue Jays record for the largest margin of victory. Duran was optioned back to Worcester on August 27, when Trevor Story was activated from the injured list. Duran was later recalled by the Red Sox for one game in Toronto, on September 30, having been vaccinated since the June series. Overall for the season, Duran played in 58 major-league games, batting .221 with 3 home runs and 17 RBIs, and 68 minor-league games, batting .283 with 10 home runs and 38 RBIs.

International career
Duran played in the 2021 Caribbean Series for the Criollos de Caguas, where he helped lead the team to the championship game and was selected to the All-Tournament Team.

In May 2021, Duran was named to the roster of the United States national baseball team for the Americas Qualifying Event. While the team qualified for the 2020 Summer Olympics, held in Tokyo in 2021, Duran was not included on the Olympic roster, due to the possibility of being called up by the Red Sox.

References

External links

1996 births
Living people
American baseball players of Mexican descent
Baseball players from California
Boston Red Sox players
Criollos de Caguas players
Greenville Drive players
Liga de Béisbol Profesional Roberto Clemente outfielders
Long Beach State Dirtbags baseball players
Lowell Spinners players
Major League Baseball outfielders
People from Corona, California
Peoria Javelinas players
Portland Sea Dogs players
Salem Red Sox players
Sportspeople from Orange County, California
United States national baseball team players
Wareham Gatemen players
Worcester Red Sox players
2023 World Baseball Classic players